Arenaria nevadensis is a species of flowering plant in the family Caryophyllaceae. It is endemic to Spain.  Its natural habitat is Mediterranean Matorral shrubby vegetation. It is threatened by habitat loss.

References

nevadensis
Endemic flora of Spain
Endemic flora of the Iberian Peninsula
Matorral shrubland
Critically endangered plants
Taxonomy articles created by Polbot
Taxa named by Pierre Edmond Boissier
Taxa named by George François Reuter